Gerhard Prinzing (22 April 1943 – 13 October 2018) was a German alpine skier who competed in the 1968 Winter Olympics.

References

1943 births
2018 deaths
German male alpine skiers
Olympic alpine skiers of West Germany
Alpine skiers at the 1968 Winter Olympics
People from Oberallgäu
Sportspeople from Swabia (Bavaria)
20th-century German people